The CAC Mid 60 (formerly the CAC Mid 100) is a stock market index used by the Paris Bourse. It is a mid-cap index which represents the 60 largest French equities after the CAC 40 and the CAC Next 20. The index was inaugurated in 2005, with the number of index constituents being reduced from 100 to 60 in March 2011.

Index composition

Original composition 
The composition of the CAC Mid 100 index at its creation in 2005.

 Alain Afflelou
 April Group
 Areva CI
 Alstom
 Alten
 Altran Technologies
 Assystem Brime
 Bacou-Dalloz
 Bains de Mer de Monaco (Société des)
 Bénéteau
 Société Bic
 Boiron
 Bonduelle
 Bongrain
 Bull
 Camaieu
 Canal+
 Carbone Lorraine
 Cegedim
 CFF recycling
 Chargeurs
 Ciments Français
 Clarins
 Club Méditerranée
 Compagnie des Alpes
 Elior
 Euler Hermes
 Euro Disney SCA
 Eurotunnel
 Faurecia
 FIMALAC
 Finifo
 Foncia Groupe
 Gemplus International
 Générale de Santé
 Géodis
 Géophysique
 GiFi
 GL Trade
 Groupe Bourbon
 Groupe Partouche
 Guyenne et Gascogne
 Hyparlo
 Iliad
 Ingenico
 Ipsos
 JCDecaux
 Kaufman & Broad
 Klépierre
 LDC
 Lisi
 Locindus
 Manitou BF
 Manutan International
 Medidep
 Norbert Dentressangle
 Nexans
 NRJ Group
 Oberthur Card Systeme
 ORPEA
 Pierre & Vacances
 Plastic Omnium
 Rallye
 Rémy Cointreau
 Rhodia
 Rodriguez Group
 Rubis
 Scor
 SEB
 Séché Environnement
 Sopra Group
 Spir Communication
 Steria
 Sucrerie de Pithiviers-le-Vieil
 Teleperformance
 Toupargel-Agrigel
 Trader Classified Media
 Trigano
 Ubisoft
 UFF
 Unilog
 Vallourec
 Viel et Compagnie
 Vilmorin Clause & Compagnie
 Zodiac Group

See also
 List of companies of France
 CAC 40
 CAC Next 20

References

External links 
 Official Euronext CAC Mid 60 page

 
French stock market indices
Lists of companies of France